WebOS is a Linux operating system for smart devices, and formerly a mobile operating system. It was initially developed by Palm, which was later acquired by Hewlett-Packard, and then LG Electronics. Palm launched WebOS in January 2009. Various versions of WebOS have been featured on several devices, including Pre, Pixi, and Veer phones and the HP TouchPad tablet. The latest version, 3.0.5, was released on 12 January 2012.

Palm / HP devices

References

Lists of operating systems
Software version histories
webOS
WebOS